was a major Japanese bank which merged with Mitsui Bank in 1990 to form Mitsui Taiyo Kobe Bank (MTKB), renamed The Sakura Bank in April 1992. Sakura Bank is now part of Sumitomo Mitsui Banking Corporation (SMBC). TKB was unique during its time in that it was a major commercial bank unaffiliated with a keiretsu group or a general trading company.

History

The Bank of Kobe was established in Kobe in 1936 and became a major lender to the industrial sector in the Kobe region, as well as a major financier for the city of Kobe. It established several overseas offices in the 1950s and 1960s to support its municipal finance operations.

Bank of Kobe merged with Taiyo Bank in 1973. Taiyo Bank was descended from Dai Nippon Mujin, a mutual savings and loan company established in 1940. It changed its name to Nippon Mujin in 1948 and to Nippon Sogo Bank in 1951 before adopting the Taiyo Bank name in 1968 in an attempt to project a more international image.

The 1973 merger gave TKB the largest branch network of any Japanese bank. The bank grew consistently through the 1970s and 1980s and opened numerous overseas offices.

TKB agreed to merge with Mitsui Bank in 1989. At the time (in the midst of the Japanese asset price bubble), the merger was to create the second largest bank in the world behind Dai-Ichi Kangyo Bank. While TKB had a strong base of individual and small business customers, Mitsui had a complementary base of larger institutional clients. The merger was aimed at leveraging these synergies, as well as providing stronger competition against European banks, which were expected to consolidate following a deregulation in 1992.

References

Defunct banks of Japan
Companies formerly listed on the Tokyo Stock Exchange
Banks disestablished in 1990
Japanese companies disestablished in 1990